Zeydabad (also Romanized as Zeydābād) is a village in Robat Rural District, in the Central District of Sabzevar County, Razavi Khorasan Province, Iran. At the 2006 census, its population was 152, in 51 families.

References 

Populated places in Sabzevar County